HMS Cygnet was a modified Black Swan-class sloop of the Royal Navy. She was laid down by Cammell Laird, Birkenhead on 30 August 1941, launched on 28 July 1942 and commissioned on 1 December 1943, with the pennant number U38.

Construction and career
After tests and its operational commissioning in November 1942 at Tobermory, HMS Cygnet was damaged by an air attack on 9 December, which took it to a commercial shipyard on the Clyde in Scotland until March 1943.

In March 1943, he joined the 2nd Escort Group based in Liverpool and was deployed with the Group as part of an escort of a military convoy to Gibraltar on its return to the United Kingdom.

She was transferred in April 1943 to the 7th Escort Group based in Greenock to support convoys threatened with attack by U-Boote in the North Atlantic.

After a passage to the 2nd Escort Group in May 1943 for the protection of the ONS8 convoy, he returned to the 7th Escort Group in June 1943, Cygnet joined the defense group of military convoys during the passage through the Mediterranean for the planned Allied landings of Sicily as part of Operation Husky.

In early 1944, he joined the Home Fleet and participated in several protections of Arctic convoys as well as the defense of Atlantic convoys.

On 8 April 1944 the Cygnet with the sloop HMS Crane sank the U-962 in the North Atlantic north-west of Cape Finisterre by depth charges.

On 13 April 1944 it was damaged by its grounding on entering Belfast, depriving it of actions during the Normandy landings.

It resumed the protection of convoys from July 1944 until the end of the war in Europe leaving or arriving from Kola Bay. At the end of May, he was appointed to join the Pacific. She entered a commercial yard in Leith for repairs and improvements for her future theater of operations until early September, or during sea trials after the refit, she was again damaged by a grounding and had to resume repairs.

The order to leave for the Pacific was canceled following the dropping of atomic bombs on Hiroshima and Nagasaki and the subsequent surrender of Japan.

References

Further reading 
 
 
 
 
 

 

1942 ships
Black Swan-class sloops
Ships built on the River Mersey
Sloops of the United Kingdom
World War II sloops of the United Kingdom